State Street Commercial Historic District is a national historic district located at Hammond, Lake County, Indiana.   The district encompasses 28 contributing buildings in the central business district of Hammond. It developed between about 1885 and 1946, and includes notable example of Commercial, Classical Revival, Late Gothic Revival, and Art Deco style architecture.  Notable buildings include the L. Fish Building (1927), Federal Building (1939), Lincoln Hotel (1923), Seifer Building (1925), and the Henderson Building (1902).

It was listed in the National Register of Historic Places in 1999.

References

Historic districts on the National Register of Historic Places in Indiana
Neoclassical architecture in Indiana
Gothic Revival architecture in Indiana
Art Deco architecture in Indiana
Historic districts in Hammond, Indiana
National Register of Historic Places in Lake County, Indiana